Codon schenckii is a species of flowering plant in the genus Codon. It is endemic to Namibia. It is also known by the name yellow nectarcup.

Description 
Codon schenckii is similar in appearance to Codon royenii but with smaller flowers; its corolla are slightly campanulate and 15-18 mm long; they are pale to bright yellow, with reddish dots near the apex of the lobes. It is rain dependent.

Distribution 
Codon schenckii is found in western Namibia and down to the Richtersveld of South Africa.

Habitat 
Codon schenckii is found on sandy watercourses and rocky slopes.

Ecology 
Its flowers are visited by Eoanthidium turnericum.

Conservation status 
Codon schenckii is classified as Least Concern, as it is widespread and not in danger of extinction. It is widespread and common across the desert areas of Namibia, but rare and restricted to the Richtersveld in South Africa.

References

External links 
 

Flora of Namibia
Flora of South Africa
Flora of Southern Africa
Flora of the Cape Provinces
Boraginaceae